Strauzia is a genus of tephritid  or fruit flies in the family Tephritidae.

Species
Strauzia arculata (Loew, 1873)
Strauzia bushi Lisowski, 1986
Strauzia gigantei Steyskal, 1986
Strauzia intermedia (Loew, 1873)
Strauzia longipennis (Wiedemann, 1830) – Sunflower maggot
Strauzia longitudinalis (Loew, 1873)
Strauzia noctipennis Stoltzfus, 1988
Strauzia perfecta (Loew, 1873)
Strauzia rugosa Stoltzfus, 1988
Strauzia stoltzfusi Steyskal, 1986
Strauzia uvedaliae Stoltzfus, 1988
Strauzia verbesinae Steyskal, 1986
Strauzia vittigera (Loew, 1873)

References

 
Trypetinae
Tephritidae genera